Teresa Gabriele (born 1979) is a Canadian professional basketball player. She plays for Canada women's national basketball team. She has competed in both the 2000 and the 2012 Summer Olympics.

References

Canadian women's basketball players
1979 births
Living people
Olympic basketball players of Canada
Basketball players at the 2000 Summer Olympics
Basketball players at the 2012 Summer Olympics